The 1975 Banqiao Dam failure (simplified Chinese: 河南"75·8"水库溃坝; traditional Chinese: 河南「75·8」水庫潰壩) was the collapse of the Banqiao Dam and 61 other dams in Henan, China, under the influence of Typhoon Nina in August 1975. The dam collapse created the third-deadliest flood in history which affected a total population of 10.15 million and inundated around 30 cities and counties of 12,000 square kilometers (or 3 million acres), with an estimated death toll ranging from 26,000 to 240,000. The flood also caused the collapse of 5 million to 6.8 million houses. The dam failure took place when many people were preoccupied with the Cultural Revolution.

Most of the dams that collapsed in this disaster were built with the help of experts from the Soviet Union or during the Chinese Great Leap Forward. The construction of the dams focused heavily on the goal of retaining water and overlooked their capacities to prevent floods, while the quality of the dams was also compromised due to the Great Leap Forward. The Banqiao dam had been designed for a calculated one in a thousand year rainfall event of 300 mm/day; however, more than the normal yearly rainfall (1060 mm) fell in just one day near the typhoon center. Some experts have also stated that the focus on peasant steel production during the Great Leap Forward, as well as a number of policies from "Learn from Dazhai in agriculture" campaign, severely damaged the ecosystem and forest cover in the region, which was a major cause of the flood, and the government's mishandling of the dam failure contributed to its severity. 

The Chinese Communist Party (CCP) as well as the Chinese government subsequently concealed the details of the disaster until the 1990s, when The Great Floods in China's History, a book prefaced by Qian Zhengying who served as the Minister of Water Resources of China in the 1970s and 1980s, revealed details of the disaster to the public for the first time. The official documents of the disaster were declassified in 2005 by the Chinese government. In May 2005, the Banqiao Dam failure was rated No.1 in "The Ultimate 10 Technological Disasters" of the world by Discovery Channel, outranking the Chernobyl nuclear disaster.

Historical background

Construction 
Starting in the early 1950s, three major reservoirs and dams, including Banqiao Dam, Shimantan Dam and the Baisha Dam, were under construction in Zhumadian of Henan Province. The long-term project, under the name of "Harness the Huai River",  was launched to prevent flooding and to utilize the water for irrigation and generating electricity. 

At the time, Chinese construction workers had no experience with building major reservoirs and, as a result, the design and construction was completely under the guidance of experts from the Soviet Union. The design of the dams overly focused on the purpose of water storage while overlooking the capacities of preventing floods. By 1953, the construction work at the three reservoirs was completed, but a "reinforcement" project on Banqiao and Shimantan dams was further carried out from 1955 to 1956 following the instructions of the Soviet Union.  After renovations, the Banqiao dam was known as the "Iron Dam (铁壳坝)" to reflect its invincibility.

The period of Great Leap Forward 

During the Great Leap Forward, launched by Mao Zedong, over 100 dams were built in the Zhumadian region from 1957–1959. Tan Zhenlin, then Vice Premier of the People's Republic of China, issued the guidelines on reservoir construction during his trip to Henan Province: "focusing on retaining water, building more small reservoirs". At the time, "retaining more water" meant "more revolutionary".

On the other hand, the intense production of steel during the Great Leap Forward as well as the "Learn from Dazhai in agriculture" program launched by Mao severely damaged the ecosystem in the Zhumadian region. The percentage of forest cover dropped drastically and land degradation was prevalent, which, according to most experts, were the major causes of floods.

Whistle-blower 
Chen Xing, then chief engineer of the dam projects, opposed the ideas of constructing too many dams as well as prioritizing the goal of "retaining water". He pointed out that the local geographical conditions made it unreasonable to overly emphasize the reservoir's function of water storage, because otherwise there was risk of creating serious floods and other disasters such as alkalinization of farm land. Nevertheless, Chen's warning was ignored and he was criticized for being a "Rightist" and "Opportunist"; he was subsequently removed from his post and was sent to Xinyang.

The Cultural Revolution 
The collapse of the dams occurred during the Chinese Cultural Revolution (1966-1976), when most people were busy with the revolution and had little time with the dams while it was raining heavily. In fact, there were no resources or equipments available to prevent the flood. 

After the disaster, Zhang Guangyou (张广友), a journalist from the Xinhua News Agency visited the area and interviewed several experts, who were afraid to express their opinions in public lest they be condemned for "questioning the Cultural Revolution" and "questioning Chairman Mao". However, the experts told Zhang privately that the land degradation and the damage to the ecosystem due to Mao's Great Leap Forward were the major causes of the collapse of the dams.

The collapse of dams

Typhoon Nina

August 6–7 
Communication with the dam was largely lost due to failures. On August 6, a request to open the dam was rejected because of the existing flooding in downstream areas.

On August 7 the request was accepted, but the telegrams failed to reach the dam. The sluice gates were not able to handle the overflow of water partially due to sedimentation blockage. On August 7 at 21:30, the People's Liberation Army Unit 34450 (by name the 2nd Artillery Division in residence at Queshan county), which was deployed on the Banqiao Dam, sent the first dam failure warning via telegraph.

August 8 
On August 8, at 01:00, water at Banqiao crested at 117.94 m above sea level, or 0.3 m higher than the wave protection wall on the dam, and it failed. The same storm caused the failure of 62 dams in total. The runoff of Banqiao Dam was 13,000 m3 per second in vs. 78,800m3 per second out, and as a result 701 million m3 of water was released in 6 hours, while 1.67 billion m3 of water was released in 5.5 hours at an upriver Shimantan Dam, and 15.738 billion m3 of water was released in total.
Seven county seats, Suiping, Xiping (西平), Ru'nan (汝南), Pingyu (平舆), Xincai (新蔡), Luohe (漯河), and Linquan (临泉) were inundated, as were thousands of square kilometers of countryside and countless communities. Evacuation orders had not been fully delivered due to weather conditions and poor communications. Telegraphs failed, signal flares fired by Unit 34450 were misunderstood, telephones were rare, and some messengers were caught by the flood.

To protect other dams from failure, several flood diversion areas were evacuated and inundated, and several dams were deliberately destroyed by air strikes to release water in desired directions. The Nihewa and Laowangpo flood diversion areas downstream of the dams soon exceeded their capacity and gave up part of their storage on August 8, forcing more flood diversion areas to begin to evacuate.

August 9 
The dikes on the Quan River collapsed in the evening of August 9, and the entire Linquan county in Fuyang, Anhui was inundated. As the Boshan Dam, with a capacity of 400 million m3, crested and the water released from the failures of Banqiao and Shimantan was rushing downstream, air strikes were made against several other dams to protect the Suya Lake dam, already holding 1.2 billion m3 of water.

Later period 
The Jingguang Railway, a major artery from Beijing to Guangzhou, was cut for 18 days, as were other crucial communications lines. Although 42,618 People's Liberation Army troops were deployed for disaster relief, all communication to and from the cities was cut. Nine days later there were still over a million people trapped by the waters, who relied on airdrops of food and were unreachable by disaster relief workers. Epidemics and famine devastated the trapped survivors.

Aftermath

Cover-up and declassification 
After the disaster, the Chinese Communist Party and the Chinese government remained silent to the public, while no media were allowed to make reports.

In 1987, Yu Weimin (于为民), a journalist from Henan Daily wrote a book on the disaster, while in 1995 the news agency took the lead and published details about the disaster to the public. At the official level, The Great Floods in China's History revealed part of the information to the public for the first time; the book was prefaced by Qian Zhengying who served as the Minister of Water Resources of China in 1970s and 1980s.

The official documents of this disaster were considered a state secret until 2005 when they were declassified. Scientists from China, Italy and the United States subsequently attended a seminar in Beijing, discussing the details.

Casualties 
Unofficial figures reported that 85,600-240,000 people died as a result of the dam breaking, although the official figure is 26,000. For example, while only 827 out of 6,000 people died in the evacuated community of Shahedian just below Banqiao Dam, half of a total of 36,000 people died in the unevacuated Wencheng commune of Suipin County next to Shahedian, and the Daowencheng Commune was wiped from the map, killing all 9,600 citizens. 

 In August 1975, preliminary figures from the Committee of Communist Party in Henan stated that there were 85,600 people from Henan who died in the disaster, while the total death toll did not exceed 100,000 taking account of the people from outside the province. The Committee believed that the figures were relatively accurate and made a report to the Central Committee of the Chinese Communist Party.
In 1980s, several representatives of the Chinese People's Political Consultative Conference including Qiao Peixin (乔培新), Sun Yueqi (孙越崎), Lin Hua (林华), Qian Jiaju (千家驹), Wang Xingrang (王兴让), Lei Tianjue (雷天觉), Xu Chi (徐驰) and Lu Qinkan (陆钦侃) revealed that the death toll of the 1975 Banqiao Dam failure was 230,000.
 In 1990s, The Great Floods in China's History revealed that approximately 26,000 people died in the province from flooding; in addition, about 5,960,000 buildings collapsed, and 11 million residents were affected. Interestingly, Luo ChengZheng (骆承政), one of the authors of the book, wrote "85,600 people died in the Banqiao Dam failure in 1975" in one edition of the book.
In 1995, the Human Rights Watch stated in its report that the death toll was approximately 230,000.
In 2005, the Ultimate 10 show of Discovery Channel rated the Banqiao Dam failure as the greatest technological catastrophe of the world, beating the Chernobyl nuclear disaster in the Soviet Union. Discovery cited the death toll to be 240,000, which included 140,000 deaths due to famine, infections and epidemics.

Governmental assessment 
The Chinese government deems the dam failure a natural one as opposed to man-made disaster, with government sources placing an emphasis on the amount of rainfall as opposed to poor engineering and construction. The People's Daily has maintained that the dam was designed to survive a once-in-1000-years flood (300 mm of rainfall per day) but a once-in-2000-years flood occurred in August 1975, following the collision of Typhoon Nina and a cold front. The typhoon was blocked for two days before its direction ultimately changed from northeastward to westward. As a result of this near stationary thunderstorm system, more than a year's worth of rain fell within 24 hours, which weather forecasts failed to predict. China Central Television reported that the typhoon disappeared from radar as it degraded. According to Xinhua, the forecast was for rainfall of 100 mm by the Beijing-based Central Meteorological Observatory. 

After the flood, a summit of National Flood Prevention and Reservoir Security at Zhengzhou, Henan was held by the Department of Water Conservancy and Electricity, and a nationwide reservoir security examination was performed.

See also 
 History of the People's Republic of China
 List of hydroelectric power station failures

References

Further reading 

Dam Failure and Flood Event Case History Compilation. United States Bureau of Reclamation (June 2015).
"THE THREE GORGES DAM IN CHINA: Forced Resettlement, Suppression of Dissent and Labor Rights Concerns". Human Rights Watch (February 1995).

External links 
"The Ultimate 10 Technological Disasters". The Ultimate 10, Discovery Channel (May 28, 2005).
"Banqiao dam failure in 1975, Henan, China". Environmental Justice Atlas (2018).  

Cultural Revolution
Floods in China
Dam failures in Asia
1975 disasters in China
1975 floods in Asia
1975 in China
August 1975 events in Asia
Man-made disasters in China
Disasters in Henan